"Been to Canaan" is a song written by Carole King introduced on King's 1972 album release, Rhymes & Reasons. Released as that album's lead single, "Been to Canaan" peaked at number 24 on the Billboard Hot 100 in January 1973 and it was the second of King's four number one hits on the Easy Listening chart. The single also reached number 20 on the Cashbox chart.

Cash Box described it as a "a delightful MOR/Pop smash."

Cover versions
A Finnish rendering of "Been to Canaan": "Olet Nähnyt Kaanan", was recorded by Anki on her 1973 album Aikalintu.
Also in 1973, the Swedish jazz singer Alice Babs, recorded a cover on her album, Music With a Jazz Flavour.

See also
List of number-one adult contemporary singles of 1973 (U.S.)

References

1972 singles
Carole King songs
Songs written by Carole King
Song recordings produced by Lou Adler
Ode Records singles